The Diocese of Farafangana is a Roman Catholic Diocese under the Archdiocese of Fianarantsoa in Madagascar. It is based in the town of Farafangana and was erected on 8 April 1957. It performs the Latin Rite. As of 2004, the diocese population was about 900,000, with 7.9% Catholic. 36 priests were in the Diocese for a ratio of 1,985 Catholics for every 1 Priest. The current bishop of the Diocese is Gaetano Di Pietro, SCI since Benjamin Marc Ramaroson, CM became archbishop of Antsiranana.

Ordinaries
 Camille-Antoine Chilouet, C.M. (24 Dec 1957 - 25 Nov 1970)
 Victor Razafimahatratra, S.J. (16 Jan 1971 - 10 Apr 1976), appointed Archbishop of Tananarive (Cardinal in 1976)
 Charles-Remy Rakotonirina, S.J. (28 Oct 1976 - 6 Aug 2005)
 Benjamin Marc Balthason Ramaroson, C.M. (26 Nov 2005 - 27 Nov 2013), appointed Archbishop of Antsiranana
 Gaetano Di Pierro, S.C.I. (3 Mar 2018 - )

See also
Catholic Church in Madagascar

References

External links
 Profile of Farafangana Diocese

Roman Catholic dioceses in Madagascar
1957 establishments in Madagascar
Roman Catholic Ecclesiastical Province of Fianarantsoa